Maurits Post (ca. 10 December 1645 – 6 June 1677) was a Dutch Golden Age architect.

Biography
Post was born in Haarlem, the son of the architect Pieter Post, and was probably his assistant, as he took over his father's projects when he died in 1669, and continued working in the neo-classical style. He worked in Siegen, The Hague, Dieren, Honselersdijk, Soestdijk, and Zuilenstein. He became the architect for Stadtholder William III of Orange from 1672 until his own early death at The Hague in 1677. Famous buildings include Castle Amerongen and the royal palaces Soestdijk Palace, Huis ten Bosch Palace and Noordeinde Palace.

References

1645 births
1677 deaths
Dutch Golden Age architects
Artists from Haarlem
Court architects